Liu Heng (born 6 January 1996) is a Chinese footballer who currently plays for Dandong Tengyue in China League Two.

Club career
Liu Heng started his professional football career in 2015 when his was loaned to China League Two side Baotou Nanjiao from Hangzhou Greentown. In February 2017, Liu transferred to his home town club Henan Jianye in the Chinese Super League. He made his debut for Henan on 7 April 2017 in a 1–0 away defeat against Beijing Guoan.

Career statistics
.

References

External links
 

1996 births
Living people
Chinese footballers
People from Shangqiu
Footballers from Henan
Henan Songshan Longmen F.C. players
Chinese Super League players
Association football defenders